Erik Morales vs. Manny Pacquiao II, was a super featherweight boxing match. The bout took place on January 21, 2006 at the Thomas & Mack Center, Las Vegas, Nevada, United States and was distributed by HBO PPV. The bout is the second of the Pacquiao-Morales trilogy, widely considered one of the greatest boxing trilogies of all time.

Pacquiao dominated the fight, eventually scoring a technical knockout win against Morales in the tenth round and avenge the third loss of his career in their first fight.

References

Morales
2006 in boxing
Boxing in Las Vegas
2006 in sports in Nevada
Boxing on HBO
January 2006 sports events in the United States